The 1st Brigade Combat Team, 1st Infantry Division (aka, "Devil Brigade") is a maneuver brigade combat team in the United States Army. It is the oldest permanent brigade in the Army and has some of the oldest units in the United States Army. Headquarters and Headquarters Company (HHC), 1st Brigade served in World War I, Vietnam, Desert Shield and Desert Storm. Its most notable campaigns include the Aisne-Marne, Meuse-Argonne, Picardy, Tet Counteroffensive and the Liberation and Defense of Kuwait. Since Desert Storm, the "Devil Brigade" has deployed to Bosnia, Kuwait, and to Korea to participate in a 2nd Infantry Division exercise.

History

World War I
Headquarters and Headquarters Company was constituted 24 May 1917 into the Regular Army as Headquarters, 1st Brigade, an element of the 1st Expeditionary Division (later redesignated as the 1st Infantry Division).
 1st Infantry Brigade
 16th Infantry Regiment
 18th Infantry Regiment
 2nd Machine Gun Battalion

Commanders 1st Infantry Brigade
 1917
 9 June Colonel Omar Bundy
 28 June Brigadier General Omar Bundy
 25 August Colonel Ulysses G. McAlexander (ad interim)
 30 August Brigadier General Omar Bundy
 8 September Brigadier General George B. Duncan

 1918
 16 January Colonel John L. Hines (ad interim)
 21 January Brigadier General George B. Duncan
 5 May Brigadier General John L. Hines
 27 August Brigadier General Frank Parker
 18 October Colonel Hjalmar Erickson (ad interim)
 21 November Brigadier General Frank Parker
 20 December Colonel Charles A. Hunt (ad interim)

1919
 5 January Brigadier General Frank Parker
 12 January Colonel Charles A. Hunt (ad interim)
 17 January Brigadier General Frank Parker
 27 January Colonel William F. Harrell (ad interim)
 29 January Brigadier General Frank Parker
 16 February Colonel Charles A. Hunt (ad interim)
 29 March Brigadier General Frank Parker
 1 April Colonel Charles A. Hunt (ad interim)
 11 April Brigadier General Frank Parker
 25 April Colonel Charles A. Hunt (ad interim)
 7 May Lieutenant Colonel Edward R. Coppock (ad interim)
 9 May Lieutenant Colonel William F. Hoey (ad interim)
 13 May Brigadier General Frank Parker
 8 July Colonel William W. McCammon (ad Interim)
 18 July Brigadier General Frank Parker
 21 July Colonel William W. McCammon (ad interim)
 24 July to 3 September Brigadier General Frank Parker

World War II
The 1st Infantry Brigade was stationed in New York City, as part of the 1st Infantry Division until 11 October 1939, when it was inactivated when the division was converted to a Triangular Table of Organization and Equipment.
 1st Infantry Brigade, Fort Wadsworth
 16th Infantry Regiment, Fort Jay
 18th Infantry Regiment, Fort Hamilton

After the army's conversion to the triangular division, only two separate brigades were formed during World War II, the 1st Airborne Infantry Brigade and the 2nd Airborne Infantry Brigade. The 1st Airborne Infantry Brigade was formed at Fort Benning, Georgia, on 20 July 1942 originally as the 1st Parachute Infantry Brigade. The unit changed its name from "parachute" to "airborne" after having the 88th Glider Infantry Regiment assigned to it.  After having its units removed and sent to different theatres the brigade was disbanded seven months later.

Cold War
Under the United States Army's pentomic reorganisation, the 1st Infantry Brigade was recreated as an independent unit at Ft. Benning from 1958 to 1962.  When the First Brigade rejoined the 1st Infantry Division the brigade was renamed the 197th Infantry Brigade.

Operation Iraqi Freedom
On 23 July 2003, US Army Forces Command alerted the 1st Brigade for deployment to the Iraq Theater of Operations in support of Operation Iraqi Freedom. The brigade deployed its main body starting on 2 September, closing in Kuwait by 11 September. Initially attached to the 82nd Airborne Division, the brigade occupied Area of Operations Topeka and conducted Transition of Authority with the 3rd Squadron, 3d Armored Cavalry Regiment, on 26 September. On 20 March 2004, CJTF-7 attached 1st Brigade to the 1st Marine Division to continue its offensive operations in AO Topeka.

In the following twelve months, the brigade's offensive operations killed 541 insurgents, wounded 101 more, and detained over 2,081 enemy fighters, including the capture of 18 high-value targets and 20 foreign fighters. The brigade responded to hundreds of small arms and RPG engagements, as well as over 550 IED (improvised explosive device) attacks. In order to disrupt the enemy's ability to conduct operations, the brigade captured 41 heavy machine guns, 175 RPG launchers, 3,134 mortar and artillery rounds, 1,781 rockets, and 17 surface-to-air missiles. In addition to combat operations, the brigade formed and trained the 60th Iraqi National Guard Brigade, including the 500th, 501st, and 502nd ING Battalions. 1st Brigade also sponsored over $23.8 million in civil projects in the Al Anbar province. The BCT returned to Fort Riley in September 2004.

In January 2005 the 1st Brigade was again called upon to prepare for deployment for OIF. The brigade spent the majority of 2005 refitting and training for deployment in fall 2005. This training culminated with the brigade's deployment to the Joint Readiness Training Center in August and September 2005.

In January 2006 the 1st Brigade received a mission change and began restructuring in order to better train military transition teams for their deployment.

Several security force companies, or SECFOR companies, began preparing to deploy to Iraq in the fall of 2006.

On 23 September 2009, the brigade officially moved the military transition team mission to Fort Polk, Louisiana, and stood up as a deployable heavy brigade combat team. The last of the MiTTs trained by the brigade completed their mission in October 2010.

2022 Russian invasion of Ukraine
On the 24th of February 2022, the same day as the 2022 Russian invasion of Ukraine started, President Joe Biden extended the 1st Brigade Combat Team’s deployment to Europe where it would be used to bolster NATO deterrence in Europe.

Current Organization
1st Armored Brigade Combat Team (1st ABCT) (Devil Brigade) 
  Headquarters and Headquarters Company (HHC)
  1st Squadron, 4th Cavalry Regiment 
  1st Battalion, 16th Infantry Regiment Iron Rangers
  2nd Battalion, 34th Armor Regiment Dreadnaughts
  3rd Battalion, 66th Armor Regiment Burt's Knights
  1st Battalion, 5th Field Artillery Regiment (1-5th FAR) "Hamilton's Own"
  1st Engineer Battalion Diehards
  101st Brigade Support Battalion (101st BSB) Liberty

References

1st Brigade History, U.S Army (accessed 17 November 2005)

Military units and formations established in 1917
Infantry 001 01
Infantry 001 01
Infantry 001 01
Military units and formations disestablished in 1939